Daniel Innerarity Grau (born 1959 in Bilbao) is a Spanish philosopher and essayist.

Biography 

Daniel Innerarity (1959) is a professor of political and social philosophy, Ikerbasque researcher at the University of the Basque Country and director of the Instituto de Gobernanza Democrática. Former fellow of the Fundación Alexander von Humboldt at the University of Munich, visiting professor at the University of Paris 1-Sorbonne, visiting professor at the Robert Schuman in the European University Institute of Florence and visiting fellow in the London School of Economics and Political Science. He is currently Directeur d'Études Associé de la Maison des Sciences de l'Homme (Paris). He has been professor in the Department of Philosophy of the University of Zaragoza (Spain).

He was awarded the III Miguel de Unamuno Essay Prize, the 2003 National Literature Prize in the Essay category, the 2004 Espasa Essay Prize and the 2012 Euskadi Essay Prize in 2008 . He has also received the Prize for Humanities, Culture, Arts and Social Sciences from the Basque Studies Society/Eusko Ikaskuntza in 2008 and the Príncipe de Viana Culture Prize 2013.

He has run several times in the Spanish general elections and the European Parliament in the Geroa Bai list, never being elected.
In the 2019 European Parliament election in Spain, Innerarity was the 4th in the Coalition for a Solidary Europe regionalist electoral list (CEUS).

Books in English 

1. Rethinking the Future of Politics, Peter Lang, Bern 2010.

2. The Future and Its Enemies, Stanford University Press, 2012.

3. (ed. with Javier Solana), Humanity at Risk. The Need for Global Governance, Continuum/ Bloomsbury, New York, 2012.

4. The Democracy of Knowledge, Continuum/Bloomsbury, New York, 2013.

5. Governance in a New Global Era, Columbia University Press, 2016.

6. (ed. with Serge Champeau, Carlos Closa and Miguel Maduro), The Future of Europe: Democracy, Legitimacy and Justice after the Euro Crisis, Rowmann & Littlefield, London, 2014.

Visiting positions 

2013-14: London School of Economics and Political Science

2012-13: European University Institute of Florence

2010-11: University of Paris 1-Sorbonne

2006-07: Université de Bordeaux (Sciences Po)

2003-04: Institut d'études politiques de Toulouse

1992-93: University of Fribourg

1987-89: München Universität (as Alexander von Humboldt Fellow)

Books in Spanish and other languages 

Ética de la hospitalidad, Península, Barcelona, 2001 (French traduction francesa: Éthique de l´hospitalité, Presses Universitaires de Laval, Canada, 2009).
La transformación de la política, Península, Barcelona, 2002 (Portuguese traduction: A trasformaçao da politica, Teorema, Lisboa, 2005; French traduction: La démocratie sans l'État: essai sur le gouvernement des sociétés complexes, Flammarion-Climats, Paris, 2006, prologue of Jorge Semprún; English traduction: Rethinking the Futur of Politics, Peter Lang, Bern 2010).
La sociedad invisible, Espasa, Madrid, 2004 (Italian traduction: La società invisible, Meltemi, Roma, 2006;  Portuguese traduction: A sociedade invisível, Teorema, Lisboa, 2009; French traduction: La société invisible, Presses Universitaires de Laval, Canadá).
El nuevo espacio público, Espasa, Madrid, 2006 (Italian traduction: Il nuevo spazio publico, Meltemi, Roma, 2008; Portuguese traduction: O novo espaço público, Teorema, Lisboa 2010; French. traduction: Le nouvel space publique, Québec, 2012).
Le futur et ses ennemies, Flammarion-Climats, Paris 2008. (Spanish traduction: El futuro y sus enemigos. Una defensa de la esperanza política, Paidós, Barcelona, 2009; Portuguese traduction: O futuro e os seus inimigos, Teorema, Lisboa, 2011; English traduction: The futur and its enemies, Stanford University Press, 2012; Italian traduction in forthcoming, Mimesis, Milán, 2013).
 La democracia del conocimiento, Paidós, Barcelona, 2011. (English traduction: The Democracy of Knowledge, Continuum/Bloomsbury, New York, 2013; German traduction: Demokratie des Wissens, Transcript, Bielefeld, 2013 (Chinese, Portuguese and Italian traductions in forthcoming).
 La humanidad amenazada: gobernar los riesgos globales (ed. with Javier Solana), Paidós, Barcelona, 2011; English traduction: Humanity at Risk. The Need for Global Governance, Continuum/ Bloomsbury, New York, 2012 (French traduction: Governance mondiale et risques globaux, Presses Universitaires de Bordeaux, 2013).
 (with Dominic Desroches), Penser le temps politique. Entretiens philosophiques à contretemps avec Daniel Innerarity, Presses de l' Université Laval, Québec, 2011.
 Política para perplejos, Galaxia Gutenberg, 2018

Awards 
 Príncipe de Viana Culture Prize 2013.
 2012 Euskadi Essay Prize in 2008 for the book La democracia del conocimiento (The Democracy of Knowledge)
 Prize of the Societé Alpine de Philosophie 2011 to the best book of philosophy in French language (Étique de l'hospitalité).
 Eusko Ikaskuntza-Caja Laboral Prize for Humanities, Culture, Arts and Social Sciences from the Basque Studies Society/Eusko Ikaskuntza in 2008
 2004 XXI Espasa Essay Prize  for the book La sociedad invisible (2004).
2003 National Literature Prize (Government of Spain) in the Essay category for the book La transformación de la política (The transformation of politics) (2003).
 III "Miguel de Unamuno" Essay Prize for the book La transformación de la política (The transformation of politics) (2002)

Membership of scientific societies 

 Member of the Academy of Latinity
 Member of the European Academy of Sciences and Arts

Membership of International Boards 
 Iris. European Journal of Philosophy and Public Debate
 Raisons Publiques
 Revista Internacional de Estudios Vascos
 Themata. Revista de filosofía
 Revista CIDOB d’Afers Internacionals
 Phasis. European Journal of Philosophy
 Quaderni Forum
 International Advisory Council for the Future Perfect series for Rowmann&Littlefield.

References

External links 

 Personal web: www.danielinnerarity.es
 Instituto de Gobernanza Democrática www.globernance.org

1959 births
German–Spanish translators
Geroa Bai politicians
Living people
Spanish philosophers
Spanish translators